John W. Mullen (September 30, 1924 – April 3, 1991) was an American Major League Baseball executive from 1947 to 1991 with the Boston / Milwaukee / Atlanta Braves and the Houston Astros.

In , Mullen became the executive assistant to the general manager of the Houston Astros. He served as acting general manager from July 10 to August 7, 1975, when Tal Smith assumed the permanent GM role. He remained with Houston until .

Mullen then returned to the Braves as their general manager in May 1979 after the sudden death of Bill Lucas. Led by sluggers Dale Murphy and Bob Horner, the Braves won the  National League West Division championship during Mullen's tenure in this position.

After being replaced by Bobby Cox in 1986, Mullen served as vice president and assistant general manager of the Braves until 1990. John Mullen died at age 66 in West Palm Beach, Florida, on Wednesday, April 3, 1991, having been found dead in his hotel room that morning. He was survived by his wife, Clair; a daughter, Kathleen; and two sons, Christopher and Richard.  

Said Cox upon Mullen's death, "John had been with the Braves since their Boston days. No one has done more for the Braves than John Mullen. We'll all miss him."  The Braves wore his initials, JWM, on the right sleeves of their jerseys during the 1991 season.

References

External links
Baseball America.com
Social Security database
Death info

Atlanta Braves executives
Boston Braves executives
Milwaukee Braves executives
Houston Astros executives
Major League Baseball executives
Major League Baseball general managers
1991 deaths
1924 births